Charles Diehl (19 January 1859 – 1 November 1944) was a French historian born in Strasbourg. He was a leading authority on Byzantine art and history.

Biography 
He received his education at the École Normale Supérieure, and later taught classes on Byzantine history at the Sorbonne. He was member of the École française de Rome (1881–1883) and the École française d'Athènes. In 1910 he became a member of the Académie des inscriptions et belles-lettres (elected president in 1921).

He died in Paris.

Legacy
The Karolou Dil Street in the city of Thessaloniki (Greece) was named after Charles Diehl. The street is located near the Byzantine church of Hagia Sophia that was restored by him between 1907 and 1909.

Honours and awards

Honorary degrees
 Harvard University 
 Université libre de Bruxelles 
 University of Belgrade
 University of Bucharest
 National and Kapodistrian University of Athens

Prizes
 Montyon Prize (1981)
 Marcelin-Guérin Prize (1907)
 Grand Prix of the Académie Française (1944)

Acknowledgement
 Member of the Académie des inscriptions et belles-lettres
 Member of the Medieval Academy of America
 Member of the Serbian Academy of Sciences and Arts
 Member of the Russian Academy of Sciences 
 Associate Member of the Real Academia de la Historia
 Associate Member of the Romanian Academy

Honours
 Grand officier of the Legion of Honour (1939)

Selected works 
Diehl was the author of several influential books on Byzantine art and history. His treatise "Byzance. Grandeur et décadence" was translated into English by Naomi Walford and published in 1957 as "Byzantium: Greatness and Decline".

Other published works by Diehl include:
1896: L'Art byzantin dans L'Italie méridionale – Byzantine art in southern Italy. 
1896: L'Afrique byzantine. Histoire de la domination byzantine en Afrique (533–709) – Byzantine Africa; history of Byzantine domination in Africa 533–709. 
1901: Justinien et la Civilisation byzantine au 6. Siècle – Justinian I and the Byzantine civilization of the 6th century.
1904: Theodora, Imperatrice de Byzance – Theodora, Imperatrice of Byzantium. 
1906–1908: Figures Byzantines – Byzantine figures.
1908: Excursions archéologiques en Grèce – Archaeological excursions in Greece.    
1910: Manuel d'art byzantin – Manual of Byzantine art.
1920: Histoire de l'empire byzantin – History of the Byzantine Empire.
1928: L'Art chrétien primitif et l'art byzantin – Early Christian art and Byzantine art.  
1933: La Peinture byzantine – Byzantine paintings. 
1943: Les Grands Problèmes de l'Histoire Byzantine – The main problems of Byzantine history.

References 

French Byzantinists
Members of the Académie des Inscriptions et Belles-Lettres
Writers from Strasbourg
Academic staff of the University of Paris
École Normale Supérieure alumni
Members of the French School at Athens
French art historians
19th-century French historians
20th-century French historians
1859 births
1944 deaths
Corresponding Fellows of the Medieval Academy of America
Historians of Byzantine art
Corresponding Fellows of the British Academy
Foreign members of the Serbian Academy of Sciences and Arts